is a series of kart racing games developed and published by Nintendo. Players compete in go-kart races while using various power-up items. It features characters and courses from the Mario series as well as other gaming franchises such as The Legend of Zelda, Animal Crossing, F-Zero, and Splatoon.

The series was launched in 1992 with Super Mario Kart on the Super Nintendo Entertainment System, to critical and commercial success. The Mario Kart series totals fourteen games, with six on home consoles, three on handheld consoles, four arcade games co-developed with Namco, and one for mobile phones. The latest game in the series, Mario Kart Live: Home Circuit, was released on the Nintendo Switch in October 2020. Over 164.43 million copies in the series have been sold worldwide.

Gameplay 
In the Mario Kart series, players compete in go-kart races, controlling one of a selection of characters, mainly from the Mario franchise. Up to twelve characters can compete in each race (varying per game).

Gameplay is enhanced by power-up items obtained by driving into item boxes laid out on the course. These power-ups include Mushrooms to give players a speed boost,  red and green Shells to be thrown at opponents, Banana peels, and Fake Item Boxes as hazards. The game chooses an item based on the player's current position in the race. For example, players lagging far behind may receive more powerful items, such as Bullet Bills which give the player a bigger speed boost depending on the place of the player, while the leader may only receive small defensive items, such as Shells or Bananas and occasionally coins. Called rubber banding, this gameplay mechanism allows other racers a realistic chance to catch up to the leading racer. They can perform driving techniques during the race such as rocket starts, slipstreaming, drifting, and mini-turbos.

Each new game has introduced new gameplay elements, such as new circuits, items, modes, and playable characters.
 Mario Kart 64 introduced 3D graphics, 4-player racing, slipstreaming, items dangling (the ability to hold bananas and shells to defend against projectiles) and introduced two new playable characters: Wario and Donkey Kong. It also introduced seven items: the Fake Item Box, Triple Red Shells, Triple Green Shells, Triple Mushrooms, the Banana Bunch, the Golden Mushroom, and the Spiny Shell. In addition to the three Grand Prix engine classes, Mirror Mode was introduced, in which tracks are flipped laterally.
 Mario Kart: Super Circuit introduced unlockable Super Mario Kart tracks, as both games use the mode 7 effect.
 Mario Kart: Double Dash!! featured co-operative LAN play and double-manned karts. It also introduced double item boxes. It further added eleven new playable characters: Daisy, Birdo, Baby Mario, Baby Luigi, Paratroopa, Diddy Kong, Bowser Jr., Waluigi, Toadette, Petey Piranha, and King Boo. It introduced a revamped Spiny Shell and character exclusive items, and introduced unlockable characters and karts. Mirror mode is now played on 150cc. It also introduced new alternate battle modes: "Shine Thief", and "Bob-omb Blast".
 Mario Kart DS featured dual-screen play to take advantage of the system's capabilities. It introduced custom emblems. It also introduced Online play via the now defunct Nintendo Wi-Fi Connection, a mission mode, and proper retro tracks. New playable characters included Dry Bones, R.O.B., and Shy Guy (who is exclusive to DS Download Play). This game also added three new items, the Blooper, the Bullet Bill, and the triple bananas. The Bob-omb is now a normal item, no longer being Wario and Waluigi's special items.
 Mario Kart Wii introduced motion controls, the ability to perform mid-air tricks, and bikes. The racer cap was raised from 8 to 12. It introduced six new playable characters: Baby Peach, Baby Daisy, Rosalina, Funky Kong, Dry Bowser, and two Mii outfits. It introduced three new items: the Mega Mushroom, the Thundercloud, and the POW Block, the last two of which are exclusive to this game. This game was the final appearance of the Fake Item Box. It also introduced a new battle mode titled "Coin Runners".
 Mario Kart 7 featured  stereoscopic 3D graphics and the return of dual screen functionality. It introduced gliders and submersible karts, a first-person perspective, and full kart customization. It introduced four new playable characters: Metal Mario, Lakitu, Wiggler, and Honey Queen. It also re-introduced Coins for a small speed boost, though they can now be used to unlock kart parts.
 Mario Kart 8 introduced the 200cc engine class, anti-gravity racing, ATVs, uploading highlights to YouTube, up to four local players in Grand Prix races, downloadable content, HD graphics, and fifteen new playable characters: the Koopalings (Iggy Koopa, Roy Koopa, Lemmy Koopa, Larry Koopa, Wendy O. Koopa, Ludwig von Koopa and Morton Koopa Jr.), Baby Rosalina, Pink Gold Peach, Tanooki Mario, Cat Peach, Link from The Legend of Zelda, and Villager (male and female) and Isabelle from Animal Crossing, the last six which are available as downloadable content. 
 Mario Kart 8 Deluxe added a revamped battle mode, which included the new "Renegade Roundup", the return of double item boxes, Ultra mini-turbo, and added 7 characters that were absent from the original game. These characters include King Boo, Dry Bones, Gold Mario, Villager girl as her own character, Bowser Jr, and the male and female Inklings from Splatoon.
 Mario Kart Tour was the Mario Kart debut on a mobile phone, and introduced a points-based system for certain racing actions. It introduced Peachette, Pauline, Hammer Bro (and  his boomerang, fire, and ice alts), Monty Mole, Captain Toad, Dixie Kong, Kamek, Nabbit, King Bob-omb, Meowser, and many more alternate outfits for characters. The alternate outfits are rare items. It introduced Frenzy Mode, and before its removal in late 2022, gacha and loot box mechanics, and continuously-renewing character outfits and karts. It reintroduced character-specific items and the Mega Mushroom.
 Mario Kart Live: Home Circuit uses a combination of augmented reality (AR), remote-controlled karts, and cameras, to create tracks using markers in the physical world, on which onscreen opponents are raced.

Modes 
Each game has a variety of modes. The following five modes recur most often in the series:
 Grand Prix – Players compete in various "cups" of four courses each (five in Super Mario Kart) with difficulty levels based on the size of the engine, larger engines meaning faster speeds. Before Mario Kart 8 there were four difficulties: 50cc, 100cc, 150cc, and Mirror Mode, where all tracks will flipped horizontally. In Mario Kart 8, a fifth difficulty level: 200cc, was added. Players earn points according to their finishing position in each race and the placement order gets carried over to the next race as the new starting grid. At the end of the cup, the top three players with the most points overall will receive a trophy in bronze, silver, and gold.
 Time Trials – The player races alone in order to finish any course in the fastest time possible. The best time is then saved as a ghost, which the player can race against in later trials. Mario Kart: Double Dash!! introduced Staff Ghosts, which are ghosts set by members of the Nintendo development team.
 Match Race – Multiple human players race on any course with customized rules such as team racing and item frequency.
 Battle – Multiple human players use in-game offensive items (shells, etc.) to battle each other in a closed arena. In the most used battle type, balloon battle, each player starts with three balloons and loses one per hit; the last player with at least one balloon wins. Various battle types have been added to the series, and single-player battles with CPU controlled players.
 Online Multiplayer – Players compete in races and battles through online services, such as Nintendo Wi-Fi Connection, Nintendo Network, and Nintendo Switch Online. Players can share Time Trial ghosts, and participate in tournaments. In races and battles, players are matched by VR (VS Rating) and BR (Battle Rating) respectively, which is a number between 0 and 99,999 (9,999 in Mario Kart Wii). Players gain or lose points based on performance in a race or battle. The game attempts to match players with a similar rating.

Development 

The debut game in the Mario Kart series was Super Mario Kart released for the SNES in 1992. Its development was overseen by Shigeru Miyamoto, the Japanese designer of many successful Nintendo games including Super Mario Bros. Darran Jones of NowGamer suggests that the success of Super Mario Kart resulted from the Super Mario characters, and being a new type of racing game.

Games

Console

Arcade 
 Mario Kart Arcade GP (2005, developed by Namco)
 Mario Kart Arcade GP 2 (2007, developed by Namco Bandai Games)
 Mario Kart Arcade GP DX (2013, developed by Namco Bandai Games)
 Mario Kart Arcade GP VR (2017, developed by Bandai Namco Studios)

Mobile 
 Mario Kart Tour (2019)

Upcoming games 
In January 2022, Dr. Serkan Toto, an industry analyst for GamesIndustry.biz indicated that a new entry in the Mario Kart series (referred to by some as Mario Kart 9) was "in active development" at Nintendo. The game would feature "a new twist", and could be announced as soon as 2022. After the report, fans theorized that the "twist" present in the next entry in the series would be crossover-centric, or take inspiration from Formula One racing.

Canceled games 
 VB Mario Kart was scheduled for the Virtual Boy in 1995. It was revealed in a 2000 issue of German gaming magazine The Big N, but was canceled early in development prior to its official announcement due to the Virtual Boy's commercial failure.
 Mario Kart XXL is a Game Boy Advance tech demo developed by Denaris Entertainment Software for Nintendo in 2004. It was originally created as a non-Mario demo known as R3D-Demo before being repurposed.

Reception 

The Mario Kart series is critically acclaimed. Nintendo Power named it one of the greatest multiplayer experiences, citing the diversity in game modes and the entertainment value.

Guinness World Records listed six records set by the Mario Kart series, including "First Console Kart Racing Game", "Best Selling Racing Game", and "Longest Running Kart Racing Franchise". Guinness World Records ranked Super Mario Kart number 1 of the top 50 console games of all time based on initial impact and lasting legacy. Super Mario Kart was inducted into the World Video Game Hall of Fame in 2019.

Sales 
Like the Super Mario series, the Mario Kart series is a commercial success with 169.59 million copies sold in total. It is currently the most successful racing game franchise of all time. Super Mario Kart is the fourth best-selling Super Nintendo Entertainment System game with 8.76 million copies sold. Mario Kart 64 is the second best-selling game for the Nintendo 64 (behind Super Mario 64), at 9.87 million copies. Mario Kart: Double Dash is the second best-selling GameCube game (next to Super Smash Bros. Melee) with 6.96 million copies sold. Mario Kart Wii is the second best-selling in the series and is the second best-selling Wii game (next to Wii Sports) at 37.38 million copies. Mario Kart 8 is the best-selling Wii U game at 8.46 million total copies sold. It was the fastest-selling Wii U game with 1.2 million copies shipped in North America and Europe combined on its first few days since launch, until Super Smash Bros. for Wii U. The enhanced port for the Nintendo Switch, Mario Kart 8 Deluxe, is the fastest-selling game in the series with 459,000 units sold in the United States in one day of its launch. It is the highest-selling Nintendo Switch game with a total of 52 million copies worldwide, outperforming the Wii U version. Both versions have a combined total of 60.46 million copies sold, making it the best-selling game in the series.

The handheld games are commercial successes. Mario Kart: Super Circuit is the fourth best-selling Game Boy Advance game at 5.9 million copies. The second portable game, Mario Kart DS, is the third best-selling Nintendo DS game and the best-selling portable game in the series with a total of 23.6 million copies. Mario Kart 7 is the best-selling Nintendo 3DS game as of September 2020 at 18.97 million copies.

Legacy

Merchandise 
The Mario Kart series has had a range of merchandise. This includes a slot car racer series based on Mario Kart DS, which comes with Mario and Donkey Kong figures and Wario and Luigi are separate. A line of radio-controlled karts are controlled by Game Boy Advance-shaped controllers, and feature Mario, Donkey Kong, and Yoshi. There are additional, larger karts which are radio-controlled by a GameCube-shape controller. Many racer figurines have been made. Sound Drops were inspired by Mario Kart Wii with eight sounds including the Spiny Shell and the race start countdown. A land-line telephone features Mario holding a lightning bolt while seated in his kart. K'Nex released Mario Kart Wii, Mario Kart 7, and Mario Kart 8 sets. LINE has released an animated sticker set with 24 stickers based on Mario Kart 8 and Mario Kart 8 Deluxe. Nintendo's own customer rewards program Club Nintendo released a Mario Kart 8 soundtrack, a Mario Kart Wii-themed stopwatch, and three gold trophies modeled after those in Mario Kart 7. Before Club Nintendo, a Mario Kart 64 soundtrack was offered by mail. In 2014, McDonald's released Mario Kart 8 toys with Happy Meals. In 2018, Monopoly Gamer features a Mario Kart themed board game with courses from Mario Kart 8 serving as properties, ten playable characters as tokens (pingas) and a special die with power-ups. In 2019, Hot Wheels released Mario Kart sets of cars and tracks. In commemoration of Mario Day celebrations for March 10, 2021, Hot Wheels also released a Mario Kart track set based on Rainbow Road on June 24, 2021. In 2020, for the Super Mario Bros. 35th Anniversary, Cold Stone Creamery released Mario themed desserts including a Rainbow Road themed ice cream cake, from September 30 to December 15.

Rental go-kart dispute 

In September 2016, Nintendo filed an objection against the Japanese company MariCar, which rents go-karts modified for use on public roads in Tokyo along with costumes resembling Nintendo characters. MariCar's English website warned customers not to throw "banana peels" or "red turtle shells". The service is popular with tourists.

Nintendo argued that the MariCar name was "intended to be mistaken for or confused with" Mario Kart, citing games commonly known by abbreviations in Japan, such as Pokémon (for Pocket Monsters) and Sumabura (Super Smash Bros.). In January 2017, the Japan Patent Office dismissed the objection, ruling that MariCar was not widely recognized as an abbreviation of Mario Kart.

In February 2017, Nintendo sued MariCar over copyright infringement for renting unauthorized costumes of Nintendo characters and using their images to promote its business. In September 2018, MariCar was ordered to stop using the characters and pay Nintendo ¥10 million in damages.

Theme park attraction 
Universal Destinations & Experiences' immersive Super Nintendo World areas in Universal Studios Japan and Universal Studios Hollywood feature the Mario Kart: Bowser's Challenge ride as their primary "anchor" attraction. Utilizing innovative augmented reality technology and dark ride set design, guests travel through several environments from Mario Kart 8, including Rainbow Road. The Japan version of the attraction includes a Mario Kart themed shop called "Mario Motors", and a nearby "Pit Stop Popcorn" food stand. The Bowser's Challenge ride is expected to be installed within Universal's Epic Universe and Univeral Studios Singapore's iterations of the area as well.

Formula E attack mode 
Starting with its 2018–19 season, electric open wheel racing series Formula E added a so-called "attack mode", which allows a driver to gain a temporary speed boost if they take an alternate lane (highlighted on television via augmented reality computer graphics). The concept has been described by members of the press and by series CEO Alejandro Agag as inspired by Mario Kart.

Notes

References 

 
Nintendo franchises
Video game franchises introduced in 1992